Diapterna is a genus of aphodiine dung beetles in the family Scarabaeidae. There are about 6 described species in Diapterna.

Species
 Diapterna dugesi (Bates, 1887)
 Diapterna hamata (Say, 1824)
 Diapterna hyperborea (LeConte, 1850)
 Diapterna omissa (LeConte, 1850)
 Diapterna pinguella (Brown, 1929)
 Diapterna pinguis (Haldeman, 1848)

References

Scarabaeidae
Scarabaeidae genera
Taxa named by George Henry Horn